Jewish Currents is a progressive, secular Jewish quarterly magazine and news site whose content reflects the politics of the Jewish left. It features independent journalism, breaking news, political commentary, analysis, and a "countercultural" approach to Jewish arts and literature.

Publication history
The magazine was first published in 1946 by the Morning Freiheit Association under the name Jewish Life and was associated with the Communist Party USA. In 1956 it broke with the Party and took its current name. From 1946 to 2000, it was edited by Morris U. Schappes.  Following Schappes' retirement in 2000, Editor Emeritus Lawrence Bush grew and sustained the magazine for almost two decades, writing columns such as "Religion and Skepticism," contending playfully with many manifestations of the "spirituality" of contemporary American culture. Other regular columns under Bush's tenure included "Jewish Women Now," "It Happened in Israel," "Inside the Jewish Community," "Our Secular Jewish Heritage," "Around the World," and "Mameloshn: Yiddish Poetry." From March–April 2005 until the March-April 2009 issue, Jewish Currents was distributed to all members of the Workmen's Circle as a benefit of membership.

In 2018, the magazine gained a new editorial team composed entirely of millennial Jews. Concentrating on breaking news, analysis, culture, art and more, the magazine is aimed at progressive Jews, and to be the voice of that community in the broader American left. Jewish Currents relaunch in 2018 resulted in the rapid growth of the magazine and its community across the US and internationally. Bernie Sanders wrote an essay for the revamped magazine on his relationship with Judaism. Alongside a book review by Judith Butler, the magazine drew attention with pieces by these high-profile individuals.

See also
English-language press of the Communist Party USA

References

Further reading

External links
 

1946 establishments in New York (state)
Political magazines published in the United States
Quarterly magazines published in the United States
Communist Party USA publications
Jewish anti-Zionism in the United States
Jewish magazines published in the United States
Jewish socialism
Magazines established in 1946
Magazines published in New York (state)
Secular Jewish culture in the United States